Canscora bhatiana is a flowering plant in the family Gentianaceae. It is named after Prof. K. Gopalakrishna Bhat, Department of Botany, Poornaprajna College, Udupi.

Description 

Grows up to 12-24 cm high and is apically branched with quadrangular stem. Upper leaves are considerably reduced and lower leaves are sessile. Pink flowers with 4-5 petals are pedicellate and appear in dichasial cyme inflorescence.

Distribution 
Canscora bhatiana grows in exposed laterite rocks in the lateritic hills of Northern Kerala in Peninsular India. Flowering and fruiting season is during August to October.

References 

Gentianaceae
Species described in 2012
Flora of Kerala